Henry Ginsberg (1897–1979) was head of production at Paramount Studios in the late 1940s and early 1950s. He subsequently produced Giant (1956).

Born to a Jewish family, he arrived at Paramount in 1940 and replaced Buddy DeSylva as head of production in 1944. He resigned in 1950, after leading the studio during a particularly successful period.

References

External links

American Jews
1897 births
1979 deaths